Verónica Langer (born 11 June 1953) is an Argentine-born Mexican actress.

Career
Langer has two Ariel Awards. In her long career, she has starred in films including Y tu mamá también, El crimen del Padre Amaro and Hasta el viento tiene miedo. From 2018 to 2020 she played Carmelita in The House of Flowers. In 2019, she played the lead role of Vero in Clases de historia. Her character is a woman in her sixties facing a cancer diagnosis, who decides to turn around her boring life.

She has been described as "a chameleon of TV, film, and theatre".

Filmography

Film
 Hilda (2014) .... Susana Esmeralda Martínez
 Nos vemos papá (2011) .... Tía Úrsula
 Daniel y Ana (2009) .... Psicóloga
 Soy mi madre (2008) .... Clara
 Hasta el viento tiene miedo (2007) .... Dra. Bernarda
 El viaje de la nonna (2007) .... María
 Niñas mal (2007) .... Mamá de Heidi
 El búfalo de la noche (2007) .... Mamá de Gregorio
 Efectos secundarios (2006) .... Miss Lola
 Mar adentro (2004)
 En cualquier lugar (2004)
 El crimen del padre Amaro (2002) .... Amparito
 Y tu mamá también (2001) .... María Eugenia Calles de Huerta
 Todo el poder (2000) .... Frida
 Extravío (2000) .... Eva
 Llamadas obscenas (1996)
 El amarrador 3 (1995) .... Beatriz
 La orilla de la tierra (1994)
 Novia que te vea (1994) .... Raquel Groman
 Una maestra con Ángel (1994)
 Tiempo cautivo (1994)
 Miroslava (1993) .... Miroslava Becková de Stern
 La furia de un gallero (1992)
 Las buenas costumbres (1990) .... Martha
 Macho y hembras (1987)
 Amanecer (1984)

Telenovelas
 Rosario Tijeras (2018-2019) .... Aurora
 La candidata (2016-2017) .... Magdalena "Magda" Gómez
 Amor sin reserva (2014-2015) .... Karina de Cisneros
 Hombre tenías que ser (2013) .... Abril Ortega
 La otra cara del alma (2012-2013) .... Felicitas Durán
 Prófugas del destino (2010-2011) .... Rebeca Fernández de Acuña
 Pobre rico... pobre (2008-2009) .... La Jefa
 Amor en custodia (2005-2006) .... Alicia
 Mirada de mujer: El regreso (2003-2004) .... Rosario
 Lo que es el amor (2001-2002) .... Jacqueline "Jackie" Lomelí
 Tío Alberto (2000-2001) .... Maruja Sotomayor
 Tres veces Sofía (1998-1999) .... Elsa Cifuentes
 Mirada de mujer (1997-1998) .... Rosario
 Marisol (1996) .... Carmen Pedroza López
 La sombra del otro (1996) .... Fátima
 Retrato de familia (1995-1996) .... Mercedes de la Canal
 Las secretas intenciones (1992) .... Paty
 Morir para vivir (1989) .... Martha
 Infamia (1981)

Television series
 La casa de las flores (2018-2019-2020) .... Carmelita
 Hasta que te conocí (2016) .... Micaela
 Soy tu fan (2010) .... Marta
 Cambio de vida (2008)
 Lo que callamos las mujeres (2001) (Episodio "El resto de mi vida") .... Angélica
 Mujer, casos de la vida real (1995-1996)
 Destinos (1992) .... Pati
 Hora marcada (1990) (Episodio "El revólver") .... Locutora / Mamá

Awards

Premios Ariel

References

External links

1953 births
Living people
Actresses from Buenos Aires
Argentine film actresses
Argentine television actresses
Mexican film actresses
Mexican television actresses
Argentine emigrants to Mexico
20th-century Argentine actresses
21st-century Argentine actresses